State Route 278 (SR 278) is a north–south state highway located in the southeastern part of the U.S. state of Ohio.

Established in the early 1930s, SR 278 primarily connects rural communities in Vinton, Hocking, and Athens Counties.  In Vinton County, it passes through and provides access to the Zaleski State Forest and Lake Hope State Park.

Route description
SR 278 travels through portions of the counties of Vinton, Hocking and Athens. There are no segments of SR 278 that are a part of the National Highway System.

History
When it was designated in 1930, SR 278 was a spur route that ran along the segment of the current route between its current southern terminus at US 50 and the village of Zaleski.  In 1937, the highway was extended north from Zaleski, through Nelsonville up to its current northern terminus at SR 595.

Major intersections

References

278
Transportation in Vinton County, Ohio
Transportation in Hocking County, Ohio
Transportation in Athens County, Ohio